The 2008 season was São Paulo's 79th season since club's existence. In Campeonato Paulista was eliminated in semifinals by rival Palmeiras. The club participated in the Copa Libertadores for the fifth time being defeated by the Fluminense in the quarterfinals. However the consecration became for the third time in Série A with an unprecedented done of three nationals titles in a row, reaching 6 titles altogether becoming the greatest Brazilian champion in history of league (since 1971), the trophy came in the last round with a victory by 1–0 over Goiás in the Bezerrão stadium situated in city of Gama, in the Federal District. The single goal was scored by forward Borges along the 22 minutes of first half. For the Copa Sudamericana was eliminated in penalty shootout by Atlético Paranaense.

Squad

Final squad

Transfers

In

Out

Scorers

Overall

{|class="wikitable"
|-
|Games played || 71 (21 Campeonato Paulista, 10 Copa Libertadores, 38 Campeonato Brasileiro, 2 Copa Sudamericana)
|-
|Games won || 38 (12 Campeonato Paulista, 5 Copa Libertadores, 21 Campeonato Brasileiro, 0 Copa Sudamericana)
|-
|Games drawn || 22 (5 Campeonato Paulista, 3 Copa Libertadores, 12 Campeonato Brasileiro, 2 Copa Sudamericana)
|-
|Games lost || 11 (4 Campeonato Paulista, 2 Copa Libertadores, 5 Campeonato Brasileiro, 0 Copa Sudamericana)
|-
|Goals scored || 109
|-
|Goals conceded || 68
|-
|Goal difference || +41
|-
|Best result || 5–1 (H) v Atlético Mineiro - Campeonato Brasileiro - 2008.6.7
|-
|Worst result || 1–4 (A) v Palmeiras - Campeonato Paulista - 2008.3.16
|-
|Top scorer || Borges (26)
|-

Official competitions

Campeonato Paulista

Record

Copa Libertadores

Record

Campeonato Brasileiro

Record

Copa Sudamericana

Record

See also
São Paulo FC

References

External links
official website 

Brazilian football clubs 2008 season
2008